Federico Delbonis was the defending champion, but lost to Facundo Bagnis in the first round.
Pablo Cuevas won the title, defeating Luca Vanni in the final, 6–4, 3–6, 7–6(7–4).

Seeds
The top four seeds receive a bye into the second round.

Draw

Finals

Top half

Bottom half

Qualifying

Seeds

 Andreas Haider-Maurer (second round)
 Daniel Gimeno Traver (qualifying competition)
 Máximo González (qualified)
 Facundo Bagnis (qualifying competition, lucky loser)
 Thiemo de Bakker (qualified)
 Luca Vanni (qualified)
 Adrian Ungur (qualifying competition)
 Marco Cecchinato (second round)

Qualifiers

Lucky losers
  Facundo Bagnis

Qualifying draw

First qualifier

Second qualifier

Third qualifier

Fourth qualifier

References
 Main Draw
 Qualifying Draw

2015 ATP World Tour
Singles